
Year 676 (DCLXXVI) was a leap year starting on Tuesday (link will display the full calendar) of the Julian calendar. The denomination 676 for this year has been used since the early medieval period, when the Anno Domini calendar era became the prevalent method in Europe for naming years.

Events 
 By place 

 Byzantine Empire 
 Summer – Siege of Constantinople: Caliph Muawiyah I sends his son Yazid with Muslim reinforcements to Constantinople. At the same time, the Byzantines have to face a Slavic attack on Thessaloniki and Lombard attacks in Italy.

 Europe 
 Dagobert II, son of the late king Sigibert III, becomes (partly with the help of Bishop Wilfrid) the new ruler of Austrasia, after his predecessor Clovis III is murdered.

 Britain 
 King Æthelred of Mercia invades Kent, in an attempt to enforce overlordship and diminish Kentish influence in Surrey and London. His armies destroy the Diocese of Rochester (seat of the bishops in West Kent), and ravage the surrounding countryside.
 King Æscwine of Wessex dies after a 2-year reign, and is succeeded by Centwine, son of the late king Cynegils. He reasserts the power of his Anglo-Saxon kingdom over the Welsh.

 Asia 
 Emperor Tenmu of Japan promulgates a decree about taxes from fiefs, and the employment of persons for the service from the outer provinces. Men of distinguished ability are allowed to enter the service, even though they are of the common people, regardless of their ranks.
 The broad-based peninsular effort under Silla's leadership, to prevent Chinese domination of Korea, succeeds in forcing Chinese troops to withdraw into Manchuria, in northeast China.

 By topic 

 Religion 
 Aldhelm, Anglo-Saxon scholar-poet, founds Malmesbury Abbey on the site of the hermitage of his old tutor Máel Dub.
 Æthelred of Mercia founds the monastery at Breedon on the Hill on the site of The Bulwarks, an Iron Age hill fort.
 June 17 – Pope Adeodatus II dies at Rome after a reign of 4 years. He is succeeded by Donus as the 78th pope.
 Cuthbert of Lindisfarne retires to a hermitage near Holburn, at a place now known as St. Cuthbert's Cave.

Births 
 January 28 – Toneri, Japanese prince (d. 735)
 John of Damascus, Syrian monk and priest  (approximate date)
 Muhammad al-Baqir, fifth Shia Imam and descendant of Prophet Muhammad (approximate date; d. 733)

Deaths 
 June 17 – Pope Adeodatus II
 Æscwine, king of Wessex
 Clovis III, king of Austrasia
 Le Yanwei, chancellor of the Tang Dynasty
 Mangsong Mangtsen, emperor of Tibet
 Wang Bo, Chinese poet

References

Sources